Debbie Zipp (born 28 June 1952 in Missouri, USA) is an American actress, author, and producer. She is best known for her roles in the film Double Exposure (1982) and television series Murder, She Wrote and Small & Frye.

Career

Film and television 
Zipp's film roles include Double Exposure (1982) and Like Father Like Son (1987).

She had a recurring role on Murder, She Wrote playing Donna Mayberry, who became the wife of main character Jessica Fletcher's nephew, Grady Fletcher. In real life, Zipp is married to Michael Horton, who played Grady in the series. Zipp also portrayed a character called Terry in an earlier episode of the show.

She played Phoebe Small in Small & Frye. The New York Times said that the character she played looked and sounded like "Squeaky Georgette on the old Mary Tyler Moore Show."

She also appeared as Katherine in episodes of Gilmore Girls. Other roles include guest-starring roles in shows like Malcolm in the Middle, L.A. Law, Magnum, P.I, The Fall Guy, One Day at a Time, and The Paper Chase. She also appeared in lead roles in two pilots which later became TV movies: The Cheerleaders (1976) and There's Always Room (1977).

Theatre 
Her theatre roles include starring stage roles in Los Angeles plays like "Sirens of Seduction", "Let's Call The Whole Thing Gershwin" and "The Good One". In their review of "Sirens of Seduction", The Los Angeles Times said that Zipp was a "sheer delight as the gangly, confused, adorable Judy."

Later career 
Zipp was head of In The Trenches Productions, where she produced, directed, acted in, edited and wrote many short films. In the late 1990s, she was co-chair of the Los Angeles-based group Actresses @ Work for actresses aged 35 and older. She ran an entertainment website for women over 40 with three other women, becoming the West Coast writer/editor/producer and the third tomato for The Three Tomatoes website, writing "A Lifestyle Guide for Women Who Aren't Kids" and their weekly newsletters.

Zipp appeared in over 300 commercials, including one with Robin Williams.

She is the co-author of and The Aspiring Actor's Handbook, which was co-written with Molly Cheek and published by Bettie Youngs Books in 2014.

Personal Life 
Zipp studied acting at University of California, Los Angeles and graduated with a master's degree. She married actor (and Murder, She Wrote co-star) Michael Horton in 1975, several years before they appeared on the show together. They have two children and live in Los Angeles, California.

References

External links 
 

1952 births
20th-century American actresses
21st-century American actresses
American film actresses
American television actresses
Living people